Vlad-Ștefan Stancu (born 13 August 2005) is a Romanian competitive swimmer. He is the Romanian record holder in the long course 1500-metre freestyle and long course and short course 800-metre freestyle. At the 2022 World Junior Championships, he won the silver medal in the 400-metre freestyle and bronze medals in the 800-metre freestyle and the 1500-metre freestyle. At the 2022 European Junior Swimming Championships, he won gold medals in the 1500-metre freestyle and 4×100-metre freestyle relay and silver medals in the 400-metre freestyle and 800-metre freestyle.

Background
Stancu attends Emil Racoviță National College in Iași for high school.

Career

2021
For the 2021 European Junior Swimming Championships, in July at Stadio Olimpico del Nuoto in Rome, Italy, Stancu placed fifth in the 400-metre freestyle, sixth in the 800-metre freestyle, and ninth in the 1500-metre freestyle.

2022
In April 2022, at the Multinations Junior Swimming Meet held in Kranj, Slovenia, Stancu helped set a new Romanian record in the 4×200-metre freestyle relay with a final time of 7:28.43, splitting a 1:53.23 for the second leg of the relay.

2022 European Junior Championships

At the 2022 European Junior Swimming Championships, held in Otopeni in early July, Stancu won his first medal on day one as part of the 4×100-metre freestyle relay, swimming the seconds leg of the relay in a time of 51.11 seconds in the final to contribute to the gold medal-winning time of 3:18.93. Two days later, he won the gold medal in the 1500-metre freestyle with a Romanian record time of 15:05.47, breaking the former record established at the 2004 Summer Olympics by Dragoș Coman with a time of 15:06.33. Another two days after that, he set a new Romanian record in the 800-metre freestyle and won the silver medal with a time of 7:54.02. The morning of the sixth and final day, he ranked fourth in the preliminaries of the 400-metre freestyle, qualifying for the evening final with a time of 3:54.96. In the final, he tied Krzysztof Chmielewski of Poland for the silver medal with a time of 3:50.61, finishing 2.47 seconds behind gold medalist in the event Lorenzo Galossi of Italy. Following his performances, Stancu announced his intent to compete at the 2022 World Junior Swimming Championships.

2022 World Junior Championships

Day one of the 2022 FINA World Junior Swimming Championships, held starting 30 August in Lima, Peru, Stancu ranked third in the preliminary heats of the 400-metre freestyle with a time of 3:51.43 and qualified for the final. In the final later the same day, he won the first medal for Romania at the Championships, a silver medal with a personal best time of 3:48.38, which was just 0.11 seconds behind gold medalist Stephan Steverink of Brazil. Two days later, he won his second medal of the Championships, a bronze medal in the 800-metre freestyle, finishing in a time of 7:56.14. The sixth and final day, he won the bronze medal in the 1500-metre freestyle with a time of 15:17.97.

2022 Romanian Short Course Championships
In November, at the 2022 Romanian Short Course Championships held in Otopeni, Stancu set a new Romanian record of 4:12.77 in the final of the 400-metre individual medley to win the gold medal. The following day, he lowered his Romanian record in the 800-metre freestyle to a 7:44.97, achieving the time en route to a gold medal-win in the 1500-metre freestyle with a personal best time of 14:41.14 that was over 51 seconds faster than the second-place finisher. On the third day, he finished 0.76 seconds behind the first-place finisher in the 400-metre freestyle to win a silver medal with a personal best time of 3:43.76.

International championships (50 m)

International championships (25 m)

Personal best times

Long course metres (50 m pool)

Short course metres (25 m pool)

National records

Long course metres (50 m pool)

Short course metres (25 m pool)

Legend: h – prelims heat; † – en route to final mark

References

External links
 

2005 births
Living people
Sportspeople from Iași
Romanian male freestyle swimmers
21st-century Romanian people